Miles in the Sky is a studio album by American trumpeter and composer Miles Davis, released on July 22, 1968, by Columbia Records. It was the last full album recorded by Davis' "Second Great Quintet" and marked the beginning of his foray into jazz fusion, with Herbie Hancock playing electric piano and Ron Carter playing electric bass guitar on opening track “Stuff”. Additionally, electric guitarist George Benson features on “Paraphernalia”.

Background 
Miles in the Sky was produced by Teo Macero and recorded at Columbia Studio B in New York City on January 16, 1968, and May 15–17, 1968. The album's title was a nod to the Beatles' 1967 song "Lucy in the Sky with Diamonds". This is the final appearance of tenor saxophonist Wayne Shorter, pianist Herbie Hancock, bassist Ron Carter and drummer Tony Williams together on a full-length studio album in Davis’ discography.

Composition 
For Miles in the Sky, Davis and his quintet pulled further away from conventional jazz and more toward jazz-rock fusion. The album's compositions are extended and groove-oriented, often with rhythms that, according to Stephen Thomas Erlewine, "are straightforward, picking up on the direct 4/4 beats of rock, and these are illuminated by Herbie Hancock's electric piano". In the opinion of All About Jazzs C. Michael Bailey, Miles in the Sky was one of six albums by Davis' quintet between 1965 and 1968 that introduced the poorly-defined jazz subgenre post-bop.

Critical reception 

In a contemporary review, Down Beat magazine called Miles in the Sky one of the best albums by Davis and his second quintet because of how it shows he had been influenced by Ornette Coleman and John Coltrane: "even as Miles denies it, for their assault on the popular song has pushed Miles along the only path that seems open to him, an increasingly ironic detachment from sentiment and prettiness".

In a retrospective review for AllMusic, Erlewine found it less adventurous than Nefertiti (1968): "Intriguing, successful jams in many respects, but ... this is less visionary than its predecessor and feels like a transitional album – and, like many transitional albums, it's intriguing and frustrating in equal measures." Hernan M. Campbell of Sputnikmusic was more enthusiastic and praised the musicianship throughout, particularly that of Williams, whose drumming he found "mind-blowing". Campbell felt that Miles in the Sky should not be overlooked because it marked the beginning of Davis' electric period and was one of the defining jazz fusion albums.

Track listing
Columbia – CS 9628

Personnel 
 Miles Davis – trumpet, cornet on "Stuff" and "Country Son"
 Wayne Shorter – tenor saxophone
 Herbie Hancock – piano, electric piano on "Stuff"
 Ron Carter – bass, electric bass on "Stuff"
 Tony Williams – drums 
 George Benson – electric guitar on "Paraphernalia"

References

External links 
 

1968 albums
Miles Davis albums
Albums produced by Teo Macero
Columbia Records albums
Post-bop albums
Jazz fusion albums by American artists